Arabdzhabirli (also Arab Dzhabirly) is a municipality in the Goychay Rayon of Azerbaijan. It has a population of 3,839. The municipality consists of the villages of Birinci Ərəbcəbirli ("First Ərəbcəbirli") and İkinci Ərəbcəbirli ("Second Ərəbcəbirli").

References

Populated places in Goychay District